William Marshall Comer (November 15, 1918 – January 15, 2006) was an American politician. He served as a member of the South Carolina House of Representatives.

Life and career 
Comer was born in York County, South Carolina. He attended Union High School and Wofford College.

In 1965, Comer was elected to the South Carolina House of Representatives, representing Union County, South Carolina.

Comer died in January 2006, at the age of 87.

References 

1918 births
2006 deaths
People from York County, South Carolina
Members of the South Carolina House of Representatives
20th-century American politicians
Wofford College alumni